Discrete Mathematics & Theoretical Computer Science is a peer-reviewed open access scientific journal covering discrete mathematics and theoretical computer science. It was established in 1997 by Daniel Krob (Paris Diderot University). Since 2001, the editor-in-chief is Jens Gustedt (Institut National de Recherche en Informatique et en Automatique).

Abstracting and indexing 
The journal is abstracted and indexed in Mathematical Reviews and the Science Citation Index Expanded. According to the Journal Citation Reports, the journal has a 2011 impact factor of 0.465.

References

External links
 

Combinatorics journals
Computer science journals
Publications established in 1997
Open access journals
English-language journals